Broad Creek is an unincorporated area and census-designated place (CDP) in Carteret County, North Carolina, United States. As of the 2010 census it had a population of 2,334. It is part of the greater Newport area and currently shares the Newport zip code of 28570.

Geography
Broad Creek is located in west-central Carteret County, on the north shore of Bogue Sound, between the tidal inlets of Broad Creek to the west and Gales Creek to the east. Bogue Sound is separated from the Atlantic Ocean to the south by Bogue Banks, part of North Carolina's barrier islands known as the Crystal Coast. The Broad Creek community is bordered on the north by Croatan National Forest.

North Carolina Highway 24 passes through the community, leading east  to Morehead City and west  to Cape Carteret. Broad Creek Loop Road forms a loop through the center of the community, south of NC 24.

Housing developments in Broad Creek include Salty Shores, Croatan Colony, Rolling Wood, Fox Lair, Bogue Pines, Whispering Pines, Karobi Park, Adams Harbor, Pearson Circle, Bar Harbor, Bluewater Banks.

Demographics

Education 
Bogue Sound Elementary School
Broad Creek Middle School
Croatan High School

Business 
Businesses in Broad Creek include the former Broad Creek Family Restaurant, Cafe 24, Southern Beverage Inc., Clarks Cable co., Holland car group(?), McStore self-storage, Croatan Self Storage, The Fuel Market, "Frank's Pizza and Subs", The Gas Man, World Class auto Paint, and the Glass & Lighting place, a beauty salon and the Whispering Pines Campground and Mobile home park.

References

Census-designated places in Carteret County, North Carolina
Census-designated places in North Carolina
Populated coastal places in North Carolina